Agonum lutulentum, commonly known as Brown-prothorax Ground Beetle, is a species of beetle in the family Carabidae.

References

Further reading

 

lutulentum
Beetles described in 1854
Taxa named by John Lawrence LeConte